The Cimarron class was a class of five replenishment oilers which served in the United States Navy between 1981 and 1999. These ships were sized to provide two complete refuelings of a fossil-fueled aircraft carrier and six to eight accompanying destroyers. All five of the class were jumboized in 1990-92 by being cut in two and a 108-foot (35.7 m) section inserted, increasing their capacities from 120,000 bbls to 180,000 bbls, adding capacity for 300 tons of munitions and improving underway replenishment capabilities. The class was retired in 1998-99 after less than 20 years of service as a result of post-Cold War force reductions, and the advent of the more economical diesel-powered s.

See also
United States Navy oiler
Replenishment oiler
List of auxiliaries of the United States Navy

Notes

External links
navsource.org: AO-180 Willamette

 

 
Ships built in Bridge City, Louisiana
1981 ships
Auxiliary replenishment ship classes